The Council of Independent Colleges (CIC) is an association in the United States of more than 650 independent, liberal arts colleges and universities and more than 100 higher education affiliates and organizations that work together to strengthen college and university leadership, sustain high-quality education, and enhance private higher education’s contributions to society. To fulfill its mission, CIC provides ideas, resources, and programs that help institutions improve their leadership expertise, educational programs, administrative and financial performance, and institutional visibility. Member institutions are drawn from across the spectrum of independent higher education, including selective liberal arts colleges, medium-sized private universities, religious colleges, historically black colleges, and single-sex institutions. The Council is headquartered at One Dupont Circle in Washington, DC.

Membership criteria
To join the Council as a full member, a U.S. college or university must grant baccalaureate degrees, must demonstrate a commitment to liberal arts and sciences through its curricular offerings and degree requirements, must have been in operation for at least three years, and must be accredited or have candidate status with a U.S. regional accrediting association. Similar institutions outside the U.S. may join as international members, and independent, nonprofit two-year institutions may qualify for associate membership.

Tuition Exchange Program

One of CIC's services to its member institutions is its Tuition Exchange Program, a network of more than 430 CIC colleges and universities that are willing to accept, tuition-free, students from families of full-time employees of other participating institutions.

Merger with Foundation for Independent Higher Education

In October 2010, the Foundation for Independent Higher Education (FIHE) merged with CIC. This merger has enabled CIC to expand its role in supporting independent colleges by also working with, and providing grant support to, state consortia of private colleges and universities.

References

External links
 

International college and university associations and consortia
College and university associations and consortia in the United States